Lamprodila is a genus of beetles in the family Buprestidae, containing the following species:

 Lamprodila aenea (Deyrolle, 1864)
 Lamprodila amurensis (Obenberger, 1924)
 Lamprodila andrei (Descarpentries & Villiers, 1963)
 Lamprodila apicalis (Deyrolle, 1864)
 Lamprodila assamensis (Stebbing, 1914)
 Lamprodila auricollis (Deyrolle, 1864)
 Lamprodila auripilis (Obenberger, 1922)
 Lamprodila balcanica (Kirchsberg, 1876)
 Lamprodila beauchenii (Fairmaire, 1889)
 Lamprodila bedoci (Bourgoin, 1924)
 Lamprodila bella (Gory, 1840)
 Lamprodila blairi (Bourgoin, 1924)
 Lamprodila chounramany (Baudon, 1963)
 Lamprodila clermonti (Obenberger, 1924)
 Lamprodila coomani (Descarpentries & Villiers, 1963)
 Lamprodila cretica (Zabransky, 1994)
 Lamprodila cupraria (Fairmaire, 1898)
 Lamprodila cupreosplendens (Kerremans, 1895)
 Lamprodila cuprosa (Obenberger, 1922)
 Lamprodila davidis (Fairmaire, 1887)
 Lamprodila decipiens (Gebler, 1847)
 Lamprodila elongata (Kerremans, 1895)
 Lamprodila festiva (Linnaeus, 1767)
 Lamprodila francoisi (Baudon, 1965)
 Lamprodila gautieri (Bruyant, 1902)
 Lamprodila gebhardti (Obenberger, 1928)
 Lamprodila gentilis (Laporte & Gory, 1837)
 Lamprodila gloriosa (Marseul, 1865)
 Lamprodila hideoi (Akiyama, 1987)
 Lamprodila hoschecki (Obenberger, 1917)
 Lamprodila igneilimbata (Kurosawa, 1946)
 Lamprodila iranica (Obenberger, 1952)
 Lamprodila jacobsoni (Obenberger, 1928)
 Lamprodila khamvenae (Baudon, 1962)
 Lamprodila kheili (Obenberger, 1925)
 Lamprodila klapaleki (Obenberger, 1924)
 Lamprodila kucerai (Bílý, 1999)
 Lamprodila kunioi (Ohmomo, 2005)
 Lamprodila leoparda (Deyrolle, 1864)
 Lamprodila limbata (Gebler, 1832)
 Lamprodila lukjanovitshi (Richter, 1952)
 Lamprodila lydiae (Bourgoin, 1922)
 Lamprodila maculipennis (Bílý, 1997)
 Lamprodila madurensis (Obenberger, 1916)
 Lamprodila magnifica (Kerremans, 1892)
 Lamprodila maindroni (Théry, 1911)
 Lamprodila milletae (Baudon, 1966)
 Lamprodila mirifica (Mulsant, 1855)
 Lamprodila nigrofasciata (Saunders, 1867)
 Lamprodila nigrogutta (Deyrolle, 1864)
 Lamprodila nigroviolacea (Théry, 1934)
 Lamprodila nipponensis (Kurosawa, 1953)
 Lamprodila nobilissima (Mannerheim, 1852)
 Lamprodila pantherina (Deyrolle, 1864)
 Lamprodila pendleburyi (Fisher, 1933)
 Lamprodila perakensis (Fisher, 1933)
 Lamprodila perroti (Descarpentries & Villiers, 1963)
 Lamprodila plasoni (Théry, 1934)
 Lamprodila pretiosa (Mannerheim, 1852)
 Lamprodila provostii (Fairmaire, 1887)
 Lamprodila pseudovirgata (Ohmomo, 2005)
 Lamprodila psilopteroides (Deyrolle, 1864)
 Lamprodila pulchra (Obenberger, 1921)
 Lamprodila purpuricollis (Hoscheck, 1931)
 Lamprodila refulgens (Obenberger, 1924)
 Lamprodila rondoni (Baudon, 1962)
 Lamprodila rutilans (Fabricius, 1777)
 Lamprodila saitohi (Ohmomo, 2005)
 Lamprodila sakaii (Akiyama & Ohmomo, 1993)
 Lamprodila sarrauti (Bourgoin, 1922)
 Lamprodila savioi (Pic, 1923)
 Lamprodila schaeferi (Descarpentries & Villiers, 1963)
 Lamprodila semperi (Saunders, 1874)
 Lamprodila sexspinosa (Thomson, 1857)
 Lamprodila shirozui (Ohmomo, 2005)
 Lamprodila siamensis (Descarpentries & Villiers, 1963)
 Lamprodila solieri (Laporte & Gory, 1837)
 Lamprodila stigmata (Bellamy, 1998)
 Lamprodila subcoerulea (Kerremans, 1895)
 Lamprodila suyfunensis (Obenberger, 1934)
 Lamprodila ternatensis (Obenberger, 1924)
 Lamprodila tschitscherini (Semenov, 1895)
 Lamprodila tuerki (Ganglbauer, 1882)
 Lamprodila virgata (Motschulsky, 1859)
 Lamprodila vivata (Lewis, 1893)

References

Buprestidae genera